Artoviridae is a family of negative-strand RNA viruses in the order Mononegavirales.  Barnacles, copepods, odonates, parasitoid wasps, pile worms, and woodlice serve as natural hosts. The group name derives from arthropod the phylum of its hosts. Members of the family were initially discovered by high throughput sequencing.

Structure 

Virions are enveloped, spherical particles, 100 to 130 nm in diameter, and the virus genome comprises about 12 kb of negative-sense, unsegmented RNA.

Taxonomy
The following genera and species are recognized:
Genus: Hexartovirus
Barnacle hexartovirus
Caligid hexartovirus
Genus: Peropuvirus
Beihai peropuvirus
Hubei peropuvirus
Odonate peropuvirus
Pillworm peropuvirus
Pteromalus puparum peropuvirus
Woodlouse peropuvirus

References

Mononegavirales
Virus families